Merja Elina Mäkisalo-Ropponen (born 20 April 1958 in Tohmajärvi) is a Finnish politician currently serving in the Parliament of Finland for the Social Democratic Party of Finland at the Savonia-Karelia constituency.

References

1958 births
Living people
People from Tohmajärvi
Social Democratic Party of Finland politicians
Members of the Parliament of Finland (2011–15)
Members of the Parliament of Finland (2015–19)
Members of the Parliament of Finland (2019–23)
21st-century Finnish women politicians
Women members of the Parliament of Finland